Steffen Reiche  (born 27 June 1960) is a German politician, a representative of the Social Democratic Party (SPD).

Biography

Private life 
Reiche was born in Potsdam. After his Abitur in 1979, he studied Theology in Berlin. He took a break from studying in 1982/1983 to do an apprenticeship as cabinetmaker. In 1986 he completed his study and was from 1988 to 1990 pastor in Christinendorf.

Reiche is married and has three daughters.

Political career 
Reiche co-founded the Social Democratic Party of East Germany (SDP) in 1989, during the political process of the change ("Wende") 1989/90 that led to German Reunification. He was member of the party executive committee. Also he was member of the first free voted People's Chamber of East Germany, from March 1990 until the German Reunification on 2 October 1990.

After the merger of the SDP with the West German SPD, Reiche until 2000 was chairman of the SPD in Brandenburg. From 1990 until his resignation in 2005 he was member of the Landtag of Brandenburg. In this time he was from 1994 to 1999 Ministry of Science, Research and Culture and from 1999 to 2004 Ministry of Education, Youth and Sport.

From 2005 to 2009, Reiche was a member of the German parliament, the Bundestag, representing Cottbus – Spree-Neiße. He also served as a member of the Parliamentary group board of the SPD.

See also
List of Social Democratic Party of Germany politicians

References

External links 

 Website of Steffen Reiche 
 biography at Deutscher Bundestag 
 Steffen Reiche's Profile at abgeordnetenwatch.de 

1960 births
Living people
Ministers of the Brandenburg State Government
Members of the Bundestag 2005–2009
Members of the Bundestag for Brandenburg
Members of the Bundestag for the Social Democratic Party of Germany